Head on Straight is Tonic's third album, released in 2002. It was nominated for Best Rock Album at the 45th Grammy Awards and the track "Take Me As I Am" was nominated for Best Rock Performance by a Duo or Group with Vocal. The album had sold 34,000 copies as of February 2003.

Reception

The album received a moderate to good critical reception, with music review site Alternative Addiction giving the album four of five stars, saying, "Tonic's amazing musicianship and incredible lyrics still shine through strong showing that Tonic is one of the few bands left in the industry that have their head on straight."

The title track was also included on the album "Chelsea Mix" which was released to promote the My Scene dolls.

Track listing
 "Roses" − 3:27
 "Take Me As I Am" - 3:36
 "Count On Me (Somebody)" − 3:48
 "Do You Know" − 3:47
 "Head on Straight" − 3:45
 "Liar" − 2:54
 "On Your Feet Again" − 3:53
 "Come Rest Your Head" − 4:27
 "Ring Around Her Finger" − 4:21
 "Believe Me" − 3:28
 "Irish" − 5:07
 "Let Me Go" − 5:54

References

2002 albums
Tonic (band) albums